"How Long" is the third single off Hinder's debut album, Extreme Behavior. The song reached #6 on the Billboard Hot Mainstream Rock Tracks chart in the United States. The song is the follow-up to "Lips of an Angel", the band's biggest hit to date.  No music video was ever made for the single.

Charts

Release history

References

External links

2006 singles
Hinder songs
Songs written by Brian Howes
Songs written by Joey Moi
Songs written by Cody Hanson
Songs written by Austin John Winkler
2005 songs